Cleta B. Deatherage Mitchell (born September 16, 1950) is an American lawyer, politician, and conservative activist. Elected in 1976, Mitchell served in the Oklahoma House of Representatives until 1984, representing District 44 as a member of the Democratic Party. In 1996, she registered as a Republican. Since then, she has worked as a Republican lawyer and conservative activist.

After Democratic candidate Joe Biden won the 2020 presidential election, Mitchell aided Donald Trump in his efforts to overturn the election results and pressure election officials to "find" sufficient votes for him to win. After participating in a telephone call in which Trump pressured Georgia Secretary of State Brad Raffensperger to alter the election results in Georgia (which was won by Biden), Mitchell resigned as a partner at Foley & Lardner. In 2021, she set up an escrow fund to funnel money to companies conducting a pro-Trump "audit" into Arizona's 2020 election.

Early life and education 

Cleta Mitchell was born as Cleta B. Deatherage on September 16, 1950, in Oklahoma City, Oklahoma. She attended Classen High School her junior and senior year. In 1971, Mitchell was one of the five original conveners of the Oklahoma Women's Political Caucus. She received a B.A. in 1973 and a J.D. in 1975, both from the University of Oklahoma.

Political career 
As a student she was a proponent of the women's rights movement and campaigned for the passage of the Equal Rights Amendment and for legal recognition–then denied in Oklahoma–of a homemaker's contribution to the value of a married couple's estate. She considered US Senator Margaret Chase Smith of Maine her role model.

Oklahoma House of Representatives 
Mitchell served as a member of the Oklahoma House of Representatives from 1976 to 1984, as member of the Democratic Party. In her second term, Mitchell chaired the Oklahoma House Appropriations and Budget Committee. She served on the executive committee of the National Conference of State Legislatures. She was a fellow at the Harvard Kennedy School's Institute of Politics in 1981.

Legal work and conservative activism 
Mitchell returned to politics and ran unsuccessfully for Oklahoma lieutenant governor in 1986. In 1996, Mitchell switched her political affiliation from Democratic to independent, and then to Republican.

In 1991 she moved to Washington, D.C., to become a pro-term limits activist; that year, she was named executive director of the Term Limits Legal Institute. She was co-counsel for the petitioners in the U.S. Supreme Court case U.S. Term Limits, Inc. v. Thornton, in which the Court held that the federal Constitution precluded state governments from imposing term limits for federal office.

Until January 2021, Mitchell was a partner in the Washington, D.C. office of Foley & Lardner, resigning due to legal concerns about her involvement in the call Trump made to attempt reversal of the Georgia certified votes in the 2020 election. She has served as legal counsel for the National Republican Senatorial Committee, the National Republican Congressional Committee, and the National Rifle Association. She has represented Sen. Elizabeth Dole (R-NC), Sen. Jim Inhofe (R-OK), Sen. David Vitter (R-LA), Sen. Gordon Smith (R-OR), Sen. Jim DeMint (R-SC), Sen. Roy Blunt (R-MO), Sen. Marco Rubio (R-FL), Sen. Pat Toomey (R-PA), Sen. Kelly Ayotte (R-NH), and Rep. Tom Cole (R-OK). She has also represented Tea Party Republican candidates Sharron Angle of Nevada and Alaska's Joe Miller.  

She is on the boards of numerous conservative organizations, including the Bradley Foundation, the National Rifle Association (NRA) (where she has also been a lawyer), the American Conservative Union Foundation, and the Republican National Lawyers Association, of which she is a former president. As a board member of the American Conservative Union (ACU), Mitchell played a major role in efforts to expel GOProud (a pro-gay rights Republican group) from the Conservative Political Action Conference (CPAC), a major annual right-wing convention organized by the ACU.

Mitchell has been a leading critic of the IRS, accusing the agency of targeting Tea Party groups. She testified before Congress in 2014, asserting that "the commissioner of the IRS lied to congress". She called for the IRS to be abolished. Investigations by Congress and federal agencies later concluded that there was no evidence that the IRS targeted conservative groups.

Mitchell represented Donald Trump in 2011, defending him against accusations that he had violated federal election laws in an exploratory campaign for president.

Mitchell was the trustee of EPA administrator Scott Pruitt's legal defense fund. As trustee of that fund, she sought donations to the fund by individuals who had interests before the EPA. In 2019, she represented Stephen Bannon's nonprofit, Citizens of the American Republic.

In 2018, McClatchyDC reported that Mitchell, as a longtime lawyer for the NRA, had previously expressed concerns about the NRA's close ties to Russia and the possibility that Russia had been funneling cash through the NRA into Donald Trump's 2016 presidential campaign. Mitchell denied ever having expressed such concerns. Mitchell's name was included in a list of people that Democrats on the U.S. House Intelligence Committee sought to interview in connection with the committee's investigation into Russian interference in the 2016 election.

Mitchell was a staunch opponent of public health measures implemented at the state and local levels to halt the spread of COVID-19. In late September 2020, she attended a White House event celebrating Trump's nomination of Amy Coney Barrett to the Supreme Court. Mitchell did not wear a mask and did not socially distance. The event became a COVID-19 superspreading event, with numerous attendees and participants testing positive for COVID-19 shortly afterward. Despite having been exposed to COVID-19, Mitchell attended another event days later in which she again did not wear a mask nor did she socially distance, in contravention of U.S. Centers for Disease Control and Prevention guidelines that recommend anyone exposed to COVID-19 should self-isolate for 14 days to avoid infecting others.

Attempt to overturn the 2020 election 

Mitchell is chair of the conservative activist group Public Interest Legal Foundation, which is known for making claims of voter fraud. She has claimed that Democrats engage in a "very well-planned-out assault" on election systems. Prior to the 2020 election, she organized legal efforts to challenge mail-in ballots cast in the election. Mitchell has worked closely with Ginni Thomas, wife of Supreme Court justice Clarence Thomas, in the Council for National Policy to organize efforts to keep Trump in power, and The New York Times reported that it was Mitchell who "enlisted John Eastman, the lawyer who crafted specious legal theories claiming Vice President Mike Pence could keep Mr. Trump in power."

After Joe Biden won the 2020 election and President Donald Trump refused to concede, Mitchell claimed that dead people voted in the election.  

On January 2, 2021, she participated in the hour-long telephone conversation between Trump and Georgia's Secretary of State Brad Raffensperger, during which Trump pressured Raffensperger to investigate unsupported claims disputing the results of the 2020 presidential election based on doctored videos and unsubstantiated rumors from right-wing media. Following that telephone call, Mitchell accused Raffensperger of saying things "that are simply not correct" about the presidential results in Georgia. Two days later, after Mitchell's participation in the call was reported, the law firm of Foley & Lardner (where Mitchell was a partner) released a statement saying that the law firm's policy was not to represent parties seeking to contest the results of the 2020 election; that the firm was "aware of, and concerned by" Mitchell's participation in the telephone call; and that the firm was "working to understand her involvement more thoroughly". Mitchell resigned from Foley & Lardner the next day. The firm said that Mitchell "concluded that her departure was in the firm's best interests, as well as in her own personal best interests". Mitchell blamed her resignation on a purported "massive pressure campaign" allegedly launched by leftist groups on social media.

Voting restrictions campaign 
In 2021, Michell took a central role in coordinating Republican efforts to tighten voting laws. FreedomWorks put her in charge of a $10 million initiative to push for voting restriction and train conservatives in local elections.

Mitchell also set up an escrow fund to funnel money to companies conducting a pro-Trump "audit" into the 2020 presidential election in Maricopa County, Arizona.

Election Assistance Commission 
In November 2021, Mitchell was appointed to the Board of Advisors of the federal Election Assistance Commission. The Board has no rule-making authority but can make recommendations to the Commission. She was nominated by Republican-appointed members of the Commission and approved by a majority vote. The EAC certifies voting machines and advises local election officials on compliance with federal regulations.

Election Integrity Network 
The Conservative Partnership Institute, a right-wing think tank formed by Jim DeMint, helped to create the Election Integrity Network project, an effort spearheaded by Cleta Mitchell beginning in 2021. Both Mitchell and former White House chief of staff Mark Meadows are senior members of the Conservative Partnership Institute, which received funding from Trump's Save America PAC.

According to The New York Times, Mitchell is preparing for future elections, and has support from other well-funded right-wing organizations as well, including the Republican National Committee. The Election Integrity Network has held seminars and trainings throughout the country, and is "recruiting election conspiracists into an organized cavalry of activists [who will be] monitoring elections ... She has tapped into a network of grass-root groups" that promote the "big lie" and believe Trump won the 2020 election. Speaking about these organizing efforts, during a June 2022 episode of Stephen Bannon's War Room podcast, Mitchell stated: "2020 — never again. That’s our goal."

Some of the ambitions of this newly formed Election Integrity Network may be achieved based on tactics such as poll-monitoring, and filing public records requests, but there are concerns that the group will also focus on researching "local and state officials to determine whether each is a 'friend or foe' of the movement." Mitchell's Election Integrity Network trainings have included "aggressive methods" such as surveillance, and encouraging participants to verify voter rolls themselves. This may put extra pressure on local officials and be disruptive to the voting process, especially "when conducted by people convinced of falsehoods about fraud."

Published works 
 'The Rise of America's Two National Pastimes: Baseball and the Law' (1999, Michigan Law Review)
 'Donor Disclosure: Undermining The First Amendment' (Minnesota Law Review, 2012)
The Lobbying Compliance Handbook (2008, Columbia Books)

Personal life 
She married Duane Draper, a fellow Oklahoman from Norman, in 1973. In 1980 he took a teaching fellowship at Harvard's Kennedy School of Government, moving to Massachusetts. The couple divorced two years later in July 1982 on grounds of "incompatibility". Draper later came out as a gay man, becoming the director of AIDS programming at the Massachusetts Department of Public Health in 1988. He died of AIDS in 1991.

In 1984, Cleta Deatherage married Dale Mitchell, who was the son of 1940s and 1950s All-Star Cleveland Indians and Brooklyn Dodgers left-fielder (Loren) Dale Mitchell. They have a daughter. In 1986, the FBI began investigating Dale Mitchell for banking malpractice, and in 1992 he was convicted of five felony counts of conspiracy to defraud, misapplying bank funds and making false statements to banks. He was ordered to pay $3 million in restitution, given a suspended sentence of five years, and ordered to perform community service. Her husband's conviction on one count was reversed on appeal and the amount of restitution was reduced. As a consequence of findings of the prosecutors' investigation, he had agreed in 1988 to self-removal from banking. According to Cleta Mitchell, his conviction convinced her that "overreaching government regulation is one of the great scandals of our times".

References

External links

1950 births
Living people
Classen School of Advanced Studies alumni
Politicians from Oklahoma City
University of Oklahoma alumni
Democratic Party members of the Oklahoma House of Representatives
National Rifle Association
Oklahoma Republicans
Women state legislators in Oklahoma
Washington, D.C., Republicans
Oklahoma Democrats
Lawyers from Oklahoma City
20th-century American politicians
20th-century American women politicians
20th-century American lawyers
20th-century American women lawyers
21st-century American lawyers
21st-century American women lawyers
Activists from Oklahoma
Controversies of the 2020 United States presidential election
Protests against results of elections
American politicians who switched parties